"I Thought of You" is a popular song composed by Jimmy Rollins.  Rollins copyrighted it in 1955 and renewed the copyright in 1983.

The song was recorded as  single by American country music artist Jean Shepard.  It was released on the B-side of the single "Beautiful Lies". The song reached #10 on the Billboard Most Played C&W in Juke Boxes chart.

In 1965, Connie Smith recorded the song on her album, Cute 'n' Country.

Chart performance

References

Jean Shepard songs
1955 songs